Dashtelah-ye Olya (also Romanized as Dashtelah-ye ‘Olyā) is a village in Qarah Su Rural District, in the Central District of Kermanshah County, Kermanshah Province, Iran. At the 2006 census, its population was 75, in 16 families.

References 

Populated places in Kermanshah County